Siegmund Peak is the peak that forms a saddle with Siegfried Peak just northward, located at the east side of the entrance to Odin Valley in Asgard Range, Victoria Land. The name was applied by New Zealand Antarctic Place-Names Committee (NZ-APC) after Siegmund of the Völsunga saga, the father of the German legend hero Siegfried.

Mountains of the Asgard Range
McMurdo Dry Valleys